Palaquium kinabaluense is a tree in the family Sapotaceae. It is named after Mount Kinabalu in Malaysia's Sabah state, on Borneo.

Description
The bark is pinkish green. Inflorescences bear up to eight flowers.

Distribution and habitat
Palaquium kinabaluense is endemic to Borneo. Its habitat is mixed dipterocarp forest from sea-level to  altitude.

Conservation
Palaquium kinabaluense has been assessed as endangered on the IUCN Red List. The species is threatened by logging and land conversion for palm oil plantations. Subpopulations in Gunung Mulu National Park and Gunung Kinabalu National Park have some protection.

References

kinabaluense
Endemic flora of Borneo
Trees of Borneo
Plants described in 1960
Flora of the Borneo lowland rain forests